Rēzekne District was an administrative division of Latvia, located in Latgale region, in the country's east.

Districts were eliminated during the administrative-territorial reform in 2009.

Cities
Rēzekne
Viļāni

Districts of Latvia